The Supply Chain Issues Tour is a concert tour by American musician Jack White, in support of his fourth and fifth studio albums, respectively, Fear of the Dawn and Entering Heaven Alive (2022). The tour began on April 8, 2022, in Detroit, Michigan and is currently ongoing.

Background
On November 11, 2021, White announced that he would release two studio albums in 2022, Fear of the Dawn and Entering Heaven Alive. A month later, White announced the tour alongside concert dates and festival appearances in North America and Europe.

During the first show in Detroit, White proposed to his girlfriend, Olivia Jean, who also served as the opening act. The couple were married during the encore by White's business partner Ben Swank.

Opening acts
On March 15, 2022, White announced the supporting acts that would be accompanying him during the tour. Punk rock quartet Be Your Own Pet is set to reunite and perform after fourteen-year hiatus. Along with the band, Sugar Tradition, Olivia Jean, Geese, July Talk, Men I Trust, Starcrawler, JD McPherson, Briston Maroney, Chicano Batman, Natalie Bergman, The Afghan Whigs, The Kills, The Backseat Lovers, Delvon Lamarr Organ Trio, Chubby and the Gang, Yard Act, SONS, Doctor Victor, KO KO MO, Larkin Poe, Equal Idiots, Mdou Moctar, Ezra Furman, Cherry Glazerr, Cautious Clay and Glove would join White as the tour openers.

Set list
This set list is from the concert on April 8, 2022, in Detroit, Michigan. It is not intended to represent all tour dates.

"Taking Me Back"
"Fear of the Dawn"
"Dead Leaves and the Dirty Ground"
"Love Interruption"
"Love Is Selfish"
"I Cut Like a Buffalo"
"Lazaretto"
"Love Is Blindness" (U2 cover)
"We're Going to Be Friends"
"You Don't Understand Me"
"I'm Slowly Turning Into You"
"Ball and Biscuit"
"Hotel Yorba"

Encore
"Steady, As She Goes"
"Seven Nation Army"

Tour dates

Notes

References

2022 concert tours